Felix Likiniano (Spanish Félix Liquiniano; Eskoriatza, Gipuzkoa 1909 - Biarritz, Labourd, 1982), known as Liki, was a Basque anarchist.

In the Spanish Civil War, he took a leading role in the defense of San Sebastián (Donostia) in the hours after the fascist uprising, cutting the rebel advance through Urbieta street into the center of the city. Later, after fellow Confederación Nacional del Trabajo (CNT) militiamen came from Eibar, they together drove back the nationalists and took their stronghold in the military headquarter of Loiola.

Later he took part in the defense of the lines at the Gipuzkoa–Navarre border and, after San Sebastián fell to the fascists, he continued armed resistance in Aragon, Catalonia, France (inside the French Resistance to Nazi occupation) and the Basque Country, trying to create guerrillas along the Franco–Spanish border.

He first drew the anagram of the axe and serpent, later used by ETA. His vision of unifying anarchism with Basque nationalism, shared with his life friend Federico Krutwig, was recognized in the early 1990s by autonomous activists of Bilbao, who created a cultural association that bears his name (Felix Likiniano Kultur Elkartea). This organization broke up in 2006.

References

1909 births
1983 deaths
People from Debagoiena
Spanish anarchists